Jean the Match-Maker is a surviving short silent film directed by Laurence Trimble, produced by the Vitagraph Company of America and starring their canine star Jean, the Vitagraph Dog. Co-starring along with Jean are the Vitagraph Girl Florence Turner and early stars Mary Fuller, Charles Kent and Ralph Ince.

Cast
Florence Turner
Charles Kent
Jean
Mary Fuller
Ralph Ince

See also
 List of American films of 1910

References

External links

 
 Jean the Match-Maker at the National Film Preservation Foundation

1910 films
Vitagraph Studios short films
Films directed by Laurence Trimble
American silent short films
1910 short films
American black-and-white films
1910s American films